The 2009 season was SK Brann's 101st season and their 23rd consecutive season in the Norwegian Premier League. Steinar Nilsen took over as head coach after the six-year tenure of Mons Ivar Mjelde. The club didn't see the big signings or sales in the January transferwindow. Local-lad Erlend Hanstveit left the club after 10 years, while thought-to-be star striker Njogu Demba-Nyrén was sold only one year after signing with the club following a season where his performance was below expectations.

The season started horrific for the "pride of Bergen". In the first premiership match of the season, Brann lost 1-3 against newly promoted Sandefjord, followed by two ties, a loss and another tie. Brann didn't win a game until the sixth round where they beat Bodø/Glimt 2-0 away.

The club's form improved as the season went by, but they were never a serious contender to the league title. After being knocked out in the Quarterfinals of the Norwegian Football Cup by  Odd Grenland), the season seemed to end up as a total disappointment for the fans. One of the few highlights of the season was the performances of Erik Huseklepp who had his definite breakthrough as a player. In his first season as a striker, Huseklepp scored 15 goals in the league, only two goals shy of the top scorer Rade Prica. The technical striker had previously played as a right winger, scoring 4 goals in 4 seasons for Brann. He also became a regular in the national team squad, scoring his first goal for Norway in the World Cup qualifier against Scotland on August 2, 2009.

Before the last games of season, Brann found themselves in a situation where they had a legitimate chance to snatch the bronze medals, but in the end they had to settle for a fifth place, which didn't qualify for a spot in the Europa League.

Information

Manager: Steinar Nilsen
League: Norwegian Premier League
Shirt supplier: Kappa 
Shirt sponsor: Sparebanken Vest
Average league attendance: 15,932 (4th best in club history at the time) 
League result : 5th 
Norwegian Cup: Quarterfinals (1-5 against Odd Grenland)
Top goal scorer: Erik Huseklepp (15 in league, 0 in cup, 15 in total) 
Player of the year: -

Team kit
The team kits for the 2009 season were produced by Kappa and the main shirt sponsor was Sparebanken Vest. Other sponsors featured on the kit were BKK (shoulders), JM Byggholt (chest), BA (left arm), Chess (upper back), Frydenbø (shorts) and Tide (socks).

Squad 

  
 
 

 (on loan from Esbjerg fB)

Out on loan

Transfers

Results 
The table below shows the results of all of SK Brann's official matches during the 2009-season.

Highlights 

January 6: Two players left Brann. Nicolai Misje did not get his contract renewed, while Michael Thwaite was sold to the newly started Australian club Gold Coast United .
January 10: Erlend Hanstveit chose to not take Brann up on their last contract offer. He reasoned his decision with his wish to play abroad. The wingback had played for the club since 1998.
January 26: Njogu Demba-Nyrén returned to Denmark after signing a 3.5 year contract with OB. In addition to a money fee worth between NOK 6 and 7 million, Brann also got the Danish striker David Nielsen.
February 26: Brann signed the young striker Cato Hansen from Bryne FK.
February 27: Rodolph Austins transfer to Brann was made permanent. The Jamaican midfielder signed a four-year deal with Brann.
March 11: Yaw Amankwah was loaned out to Alta IF.
March 12: Kristian Flittie Onstad was brought to Brann on a loan deal from Esbjerg fB.
March 16: Brann opened their Premiership-season with a poor performance against the newly promoted Sandefjord Fotball. Brann lost 1-3 in Sandefjord in a match that featured the official debuts of Bjørnar Holmvik, Cato Hansen, David Nielsen and Kristian Flittie Onstad.
March 22: Brann took their first point of the season after playing 1-1 against the reigning champions Stabæk Fotball. The match was characterized by terrible playing conditions, as the new gras at Brann Stadion hadn't had time to grow properly into the soil.
April 27: Brann took their first three-pointer of the season after a 2-0 win against Bodø/Glimt away in the sixth round of the 2009 Norwegian Premier League. David Nielsen scored both of Brann's goals, his first in the red jersey.
May 13: Brann advanced to the second round of the Norwegian Cup after a 6-0 win over IL Høyang.
May 24: Brann advanced to the third round of the Norwegian Cup after a 2-0 win over Lyngbø SK.
June 17: Brann advanced to the fourth round of the Norwegian Cup after a 4-2 win over Nest-Sotra.
July 9: Brann advanced to the quarterfinals of the Norwegian Cup after a 1-0 win over FC Lyn Oslo.
August 5: Brann signed the Uruguayan striker  Diego Guastavino from FC Lyn Oslo.
August 7: Cato Hansen was loaned out to fellow Bergen-based club Løv-Ham for the remainder of the season.
August 8: Brann was knocked-out of the Norwegian Cup after a 5-1 loss against Odd Grenland in the quarterfinals. The match at Skagerak Arena was not without controversy. After 29 minutes, Håkon Opdal and Hassan El Fakiri got injured in a duel after a cornerkick. Opdal injured his knee, but was able to continue, while El Fakiri had to leave the pitch temporary to treat a cut in the head. Three minutes later, Opdal got an easy pass that he intended to play up the pitch. Just when he was about to kick the ball, Opdal's knee gave up on him, causing him to fall to the ground and losing control over the ball. Odd-striker Péter Kovács took advantage of the situation and put the ball in the net with ease. His actions was seen as an act of unsportsmanship and a breach of Fair Play by the Brann-players. Brann also had Eirik Bakke sent off, while Ólafur Örn Bjarnason missed a penalty kick.
August 12: Bjørn Dahl signed a contract with Hønefoss BK on a free transfer.
August 26: Ármann Björnsson signed with League One-club Hartlepool United on a free transfer.
September 1: Azar Karadas signed with Turkish-club Kasımpaşa S.K. The deal was worth around NOK 2.000.000.
Oktober 19: On a press conference on Brann Stadion, Brann's director of football Bjørn Dahl announced  a NOK 20m deficit, due to lack of revenue as a direct consequence of the credit crunch.
November 1: Brann finished their season with a 1-1 draw at home against league champions Rosenborg BK.
November 21: Johan Thorbjørnsen signed for Løv-Ham.

Statistics

Appearances and goals

The table shows matches and goals in the Norwegian Premier League and Norwegian Cup, and was last updated after the game against Rosenborg BK on November 1, 2009

|}

Top scorers
Includes all competitive matches. The list is sorted by shirt number when total goals are equal.Last updated on 3 November''

Disciplinary record 
Includes all competitive matches.

Overall

References 

SK Brann seasons
Brann